Armina californica is a species of sea slug, a nudibranch, a marine gastropod mollusk in the family Arminidae.

This species occurs in the Eastern Pacific Ocean from Vancouver Island to Panama. It can commonly be found in a soft-bottom habitat from 1-230 meters in depth. Armina californica is characterized by longitudinal ridges of varying colors including light pink, cream, and brown. Features that differentiate Armina californica from the larger Armina species are separated rhinophores, rachidian teeth with 8-13 elongated denticles, and lateral teeth with 7-9 triangular denticles.

References

 SeaSlug info at: 
 Slugsite info at: 
 Baez D.P., Ardila N., Valdés A. & Acero A. (2011) Taxonomy and phylogeny of Armina (Gastropoda: Nudibranchia: Arminidae) from the Atlantic and eastern Pacific. Journal of the Marine Biological Association of the United Kingdom 91(5): 1107-1121.
 Gosliner T.M. & Fahey S.J. (2011) Previously undocumented diversity and abundance of cryptic species: a phylogenetic analysis of Indo-Pacific Arminidae Rafinesque, 1814 (Mollusca: Nudibranchia) with descriptions of 20 new species of Dermatobranchus. Zoological Journal of the Linnean Society 161: 245–356. p. 2582

External links 

 

Arminidae
Gastropods described in 1863